Sonchon Airport(선천비행장) is an airport near Sonchon, Pyongan-bukto, North Korea.

Facilities 
The airfield has a single concrete runway 14/32 measuring 1600 x 102 feet (488 x 31 m). It is a base for military helicopters of the 2nd Air Combat Division's air regiment.

References 

Airports in North Korea